Riverside School District may refer to:
Riverside School District (Arkansas)
Riverside Unified School District in California
Riverside School District (Iowa), a school district in Iowa
Riverside School District (New Jersey)
Riverside School District (Pennsylvania)
Riverside School District (Washington), a school district in Washington

See also
Riverside Elementary School District, an elementary school district in Arizona